The 2014–15 season was Associazione Sportiva Roma's 87th in existence and 86th season in the top flight of Italian football. The team competed in Serie A, the Coppa Italia, the Champions League, and the Europa League. Roma finished second behind Juventus for the second consecutive season after a poor run of form in 2015. The club finished third in their Champions League group and thus dropped down to the Europa League, where they were knocked out by Fiorentina in the Round of 16. Incidentally, Roma were also knocked out of the Coppa Italia by Fiorentina at the quarter-final stage, losing 2–0 at the Stadio Olimpico.

Players

Squad information
Last updated on 31 May 2015
Appearances include league matches only

Transfers

In

Loans in

Total spending:  €44,310,000

Out

Loans out

Total income:  €35,235,000
Net income:  €9,075,000

Pre-season and friendlies

International Champions Cup

Competitions

Overall

Last updated: 31 May 2015

Serie A

League table

Results summary

Results by round

Matches

Coppa Italia

UEFA Champions League

Group stage

UEFA Europa League

Knockout phase

Round of 32

Round of 16

Statistics

Appearances and goals

|-
! colspan=14 style="background:#B21B1C; color:#FFD700; text-align:center"| Goalkeepers

|-
! colspan=14 style="background:#B21B1C; color:#FFD700; text-align:center"| Defenders

|-
! colspan=14 style="background:#B21B1C; color:#FFD700; text-align:center"| Midfielders

|-
! colspan=14 style="background:#B21B1C; color:#FFD700; text-align:center"| Forwards

|-
! colspan=14 style="background:#B21B1C; color:#FFD700; text-align:center"| Players transferred out during the season

Goalscorers

Last updated: 31 May 2015

Clean sheets

Last updated: 31 May 2015

Disciplinary record

Last updated: 31 May 2015

References

A.S. Roma seasons
Roma
Roma
Roma